Bhawanipur Rajdham is a semi-urban market town, with population of approx 25,000, in the Purnia district of the Indian state of Bihar. It is divided into two parts: Bhawanipur West gram panchayat and  Bhawanipur East gram panchayat of the Bhawanipur (Community development block).

Transport
State Highway SH 65 provides the closest route to Bhawanipur.

References

Villages in Purnia district